The Speaker of the Uttarakhand Legislative Assembly is the presiding officer of the Legislative Assembly of Uttarakhand, the main law-making body for the Indian state of Uttarakhand. The Speaker is elected in the very first meeting of the Uttarakhand Legislative Assembly after the general elections for a term of 5 years from amongst the members of the assembly. The Speaker must be a member of the assembly. The Speaker can be removed from office by a resolution passed in the assembly by an effective majority of its members. In the absence of Speaker, the meeting of Uttarakhand Legislative Assembly is presided by the Deputy Speaker.

Eligibility
The Speaker of the Assembly must:

 be a citizen of India;
 be at least  25 years of age; and
 not hold any office of profit under the Government of Uttarakhand.

Powers and Functions of the Speaker
The speaker of the legislative assembly conducts the business in house, and decides whether a bill is a money bill or not.  They maintain discipline and decorum in the house and can punish a member for their unruly behaviour by suspending them. They also permit the moving of various kinds of motions and resolutions such as a motion of no confidence, motion of adjournment, motion of censure and calling attention notice as per the rules. The speaker decides on the agenda to be taken up for discussion during the meeting. The date of election of the speaker is fixed by the Governor of Uttarakhand. Further, all comments and speeches made by members of the House are addressed to the speaker. The speaker is answerable to the house. Both the speaker and deputy speaker may be removed by a resolution passed by the majority of the members.

List of the Speakers of Uttarakhand

Deputy Speaker
The Deputy Speaker of the Uttarakhand Legislative Assembly is the vice-presiding officer of the legislative assembly. Acts as the presiding officer in case of leave or absence caused by death or illness of the Speaker.

List of the Deputy Speakers of Uttarakhand

Pro tem Speaker
After a general election and the formation of a new government, a list of senior members of the legislative assembly prepared by the legislative section is submitted to the Minister of Parliamentary Affairs of Uttarakhand, who selects a Pro tem speaker who hold the office of speaker until a full-time speaker is elected. The appointment has to be approved by the Governor.

The first meeting after the election when the speaker and the deputy speaker are elected by members of the legislative assembly, is held under the pro-tem speaker. In absence of the speaker, the deputy speaker acts as speaker and in the absence of both a committee of six members selected by the speaker will act as speaker according to their seniority.

List of the Pro tem Speakers of Uttarakhand

See also
 Government of Uttarakhand
 Governor of Uttarakhand
 Chief Minister of Uttarakhand
 Uttarakhand Legislative Assembly
 Leader of the Opposition in the Uttarakhand Legislative Assembly
 Cabinet of Uttarakhand
 Chief Justice of Uttarakhand
 Speaker of the Lok Sabha
 Chairperson of the Rajya Sabha
 List of current Indian legislative speakers and chairpersons

References

Uttarakhand Legislative Assembly
Lists of legislative speakers in India
Lists of people from Uttarakhand
Speakers of the Uttarakhand Legislative Assembly